Kanjilassery Maha Siva Temple  is located at Chemancheri village in Kozhikode district, in Kerala, India. The presiding deity of the temple is Lord Shiva, located in main Sanctum Sanctorum, facing west. According to folklore, sage Parashurama has installed the idol. It is the part of the 108 Shiva Temples of Kerala. The temple is located around 4 km away from Pookad Junction on the route of Pokad - Thoraikadavu Road.

Myths & Beliefs
It is also believed that the Kanjilassery Maha Shiva Temple is dedicated to the worship of sage Kashyapa and is believed to be the abode of Lord Shiva. The Rudraa is a form of rhyming Shiva in the time of the sacrifice. Kasi, Kanchipuram, Kanjirangad and Kanjilassery are said to have been built simultaneously with Kanjilassery Siva Temple.

See also
 108 Shiva Temples
 Temples of Kerala
 Kollam Rameswaram Mahadeva Temple

References

108 Shiva Temples
Shiva temples in Kerala
Hindu temples in Kozhikode district